Christian Nagiller (born 24 June 1984) is an Austrian former ski jumper.

Career 
Nagiller debuted in the FIS Ski Jumping World Cup in January 2000. During the 2002–03 season he became an established member of the Austrian team. In that season came his biggest achievements – a win at Hakuba and second place at Sapporo. He also attempted 220m at Kulm but fell (his personal best is 203m). After several relatively unsuccessful seasons, he retired from active ski jumping in 2006 and became a ski jumping coach.

World Cup

Standings

Wins

External links 
 Christian Nagiller at the International Ski Federation

Austrian male ski jumpers
1984 births
Living people
People from Hall in Tirol
Sportspeople from Tyrol (state)